The Man in Pyjamas (German: Der Mann im Pyjama) is a 1981 West German comedy film directed by Christian Rateuke and Hartmann Schmige, starring Otto Sander and Elke Sommer. The film won the Ernst Lubitsch Award for best actor (Sander).

The film's sets were designed by art director Werner Achmann.

Plot
The story, set in Berlin in 1981, centres around a man in his pajamas and bathrobe who goes out to buy cigarettes and experiences a series of events that have him chased by inept police officers, an angry husband, a taxi driver, and various other characters.

Cast
 Otto Sander as Rudi
 Elke Sommer as Bärbel Lachmann
 Peter Fitz as Harry Lachmann, Detective inspector
 Hermann Lause as Bruno, Patrolman
 Erich Schwarz as Hans-Christian, Patrolman
 Friedrich G. Beckhaus as Otto Kaiser, Deputy Chief
 Karl-Heinz Vosgerau as Consul Becker
 Jochen Schroeder as Taxi driver
 Kurt Zips as Neighbour with the white poodle
 Pit Krüger as Volkswagen driver
 Ute Koska as Helga
 Günther Kieslich as Bank robber disguised as a sewer worker
 Tayfun Bademsoy as Turk

References

Bibliography
 Eric Rentschler. West German film in the course of time: reflections on the twenty years since Oberhausen. Redgrave Publishing Company, 1984.

External links
 

1981 films
1981 comedy films
German comedy films
West German films
1980s German-language films
Films set in Berlin
1980s German films